Gladrags is an Indian magazine which features modeling and related events. Every year they conduct the Manhunt and Mega model Contest, a unisex pageant in India. At the contest the most appealing male and female models are selected as winner and runners-up and the magazine promotes them.

The current winners of Gladrags Manhunt and Mega model India are 21 year old Ansh Duggal of New Delhi and Karuna Singh of Chandigarh.

They first conduct a round of selection from the regions and then post all the elimination rounds for the final contestants. The group undergoes training including physical fitness, grooming, catwalk, diction and speech.

Gladrags Manhunt Contest

History
The first Gladrags Manhunt Contest India was held in 1994, Rajat Bedi of Punjab was the first winner. He represented India at Manhunt International 1994 held in Greece and was awarded 4th Runner Up in the finale.

International achievements
In 2001, Rajeev Singh of Rajasthan became the first Asian and Indian to win the Manhunt International contest. He also won two sub-awards at the contest including Sharmoon Best Dressed Gentleman Award and Best in National Costume. After his victory he established himself in the Indian fashion industry as a successful model.

India has produced many runners-up at the pageant, most notably Dino Morea, Zulfi Syed and John Abraham, all of whom have since established themselves in the Bollywood industry. The contest has also given India some of the finest models ever seen by Indian fashion industry like supermodel Muzamil Ibrahim, actor and model Sidharth Shukla, model Farhad Shahnawaz, actor and model Abhimanyu Jain, 4th runner up Manhunt International 2006 and Arry Dabas, semifinalist in 2012. Other notable winners include Romeo Gates, Ahran Chaudhary and Ravi Awana.

In 2005, Sidharth Shukla, runner-up of Gladrags Manhunt 2004, represented India at the Best Model Of The World contest held in Turkey and became the first Indian to win the title. Later Shukla became a famous model in India and star in the Indian film industry.

Winners of Gladrags Manhunt India

Representatives to Manhunt International
 The winner of the Gladrags Manhunt represents India at Manhunt International, but if for any reason the winner is unable to compete then a runner up is sent to the pageant.

Representatives to Best Model of the World
 The winner of the Gladrags Manhunt represents India at the Best Model of the World contest, but if for any reason the winner is unable to compete then a runner up is sent to the pageant.

Photographs of some notable winners of Gladrags Manhunt Contest

Gladrags Mega model Contest

History
The first Mega model contest was held in 1994, and girls all across the country competed for the coveted title. Shweta Menon of Kerala was declared the winner.

Lara Dutta later established herself as a leading Bollywood actress.

Winners

Representatives to Miss Intercontinental
 The winner of Gladrags Mega model represented India at Miss Intercontinental from 1997 to 2003.
 Earlier Femina Teen Princess held the franchise of Miss Intercontinental pageant in India.
 From 2011, Indian Princess holds the franchise of Miss Intercontinental in India.

Representatives to Miss Tourism International
 The winner of the Gladrags Mega model contest represented India at Miss Tourism International contest, but if for any reason the winner was unable to compete then a runner up was sent to the pageant.
 Earlier Femina Miss India held the franchise of Miss Tourism International pageant in India.
 From 2011 Indian Princess holds the franchise of Miss Tourism International in India.

Representatives to Miss Tourism Queen International

Representatives to Miss Tourism Queen of the Year International

Representatives to Best Model of the World
 The winner of the Gladrags Mega model contest represented India at Best Model of the World contest, but if for any reason the winner was unable to compete then a runner up was sent to the pageant.

References

External links
 Gladrags Megamodel Manhunt
 Rupali Suri Gladrags Megamodel

Indian awards
Male beauty pageants
Beauty pageants in India
1994 establishments in Maharashtra